Davidia involucrata, the dove-tree, handkerchief tree, pocket handkerchief tree, or ghost tree, is a medium-sized deciduous tree in the family Nyssaceae.  It is the only living species in the genus Davidia. It was previously included with tupelos in the dogwood family, Cornaceae. Fossil species are known extending into the Upper Cretaceous.

Taxonomy
Davidia involucrata is the only member of its genus, but there are two varieties differing slightly in their leaves, D. involucrata var. involucrata, which has the leaves thinly pubescent (short-haired) on the underside, and D. involucrata var. vilmoriniana, with glabrous (hairless) leaves. Some botanists treat them as distinct species, with good reason, as the two taxa have differing chromosome numbers so are unable to produce fertile hybrid offspring.

Description

Davidia involucrata is best known for its inflorescence that features large, white bracts surrounding a purplish-red flower head. The Latin specific epithet involucrata means "with a ring of bracts surrounding several flowers". The true flowers form a tight head about 1–2 cm across, each flower head with a pair of large (12–25 cm), pure white bracts at the base, performing the function of petals in attracting pollinators. The inflorescences hang in long rows beneath the horizontal branches, and appear prolifically in late spring. On a breezy day, the bracts flutter in the wind like white doves or pinched handkerchiefs; hence the English names for this tree.

The fruit is a very hard nut about 3 cm long surrounded by a green husk about 4 cm long by 3 cm wide, hanging on a 10 cm stalk. The nut contains 3–6 seeds.

Distribution and habitat
Davidia involucrata is native to South Central and Southeast China. It grows in montane mixed forests.

History
The genus Davidia is named for Father Armand David (1826–1900; "Père David"), a French Vincentian missionary and keen naturalist who lived in China. David first described the tree in 1869 as a single tree found at over  altitude, and sent dried specimens to Paris; in 1871, Henri Baillon described it as a new genus and species.

British plant hunter Augustine Henry again found a single tree, this time in the Yangtse Ichang gorges and sent the first specimen to Kew Gardens. Plant collector Ernest Henry Wilson was employed by Sir Harry Veitch to find Henry's tree but arrived to find that it had been felled for building purposes; however, he later found a grove of the trees overhanging a sheer drop. Returning to Britain, Wilson’s boat was wrecked, but he managed to save his Davidia specimens, one of which survives today in the Arnold Arboretum.

Gallery

Fossil record
The oldest probable fossils of Davidia are permineralized fruits from the Upper Cretaceous (Campanian) Horseshoe Canyon Formation of Dinosaur Provincial Park near Drumheller, Alberta, Canada. Those fruits are smaller than those of D. involucrata and have fewer locules, but are otherwise similar in morphology to the extant genus.

In 2009, B. I. Pavlyutkin described Miocene fossils in Primorsky Krai and assigned them to a new species in the genus Davidia.

Cultivation
The species was introduced from China to Europe and North America in 1904, and is a popular ornamental tree in parks and larger gardens. Most trees in cultivation are var. vilmoriniana, which has proved much better able to adapt to the climatic conditions in the west.

This tree and the cultivated variety D. involucrata var. vilmoriniana  have gained the Royal Horticultural Society's Award of Garden Merit.

References

External links

Schulhof, Richard. "The Dove Tree: A Long journey West." Arnoldia 63 (4) (2005). 
Sun, Ji-Fan and Shuang-Quan Huang. "White Bracts of the Dove Tree (Davidia involucrate): Umbrella and Pollinator Lure?" 'Arnoldia' 68 (3) (2011).

Nyssaceae
Endemic flora of China
Trees of China
Taxa named by Henri Ernest Baillon